Kim Ju-hyeon (born 20 September 1980) is a South Korean speed skater. She competed in two events at the 1998 Winter Olympics.

References

1980 births
Living people
South Korean female speed skaters
Olympic speed skaters of South Korea
Speed skaters at the 1998 Winter Olympics
Place of birth missing (living people)